Army Materiel Command can refer to:

United States Army Materiel Command
Army Materiel Command (Denmark)